Trifurcula anthyllidella is a moth of the family Nepticulidae. It is found in Spain, on Mallorca and along the south and east coast from Cadiz to Girona on limestone, up into the mountains.

The wingspan is 5.6–7.4 mm for males and 5.6–7.1 mm for females.

The larvae feed on Anthyllis cytisoides and Anthyllis terniflora. They mine the leaves of their host plant. The mine consists of a narrow, upper-surface corridor with a black, often interrupted frass line. After a moult this turns into a blotch that may cross the midrib. The frass is deposited in black lumps in the basal section of the mine. Small leaves are entirely mined out and become unrecognisable. Pupation takes place outside of the mine.

External links
Review Of The Subgenus Trifurcula (Levarchama), With Two New Species (Lepidoptera: Nepticulidae)
bladmineerders.nl

Nepticulidae
Moths of Europe